Edgar Morris Wood Syers (18 March 1863 – 16 February 1946) was a British figure skater who competed in both singles and pair skating. As a singles skater, he won the bronze medal at the 1899 World Championships. At age 45, he competed with his wife Madge Syers at the 1908 London Summer Olympics, coming in last but winning the bronze as only three pairs competed in this event, became the oldest figure skating Olympic medalist. He was also a figure skating coach.

Results

Men's singles

Pairs

References

Citations

Sources

External links 
 

1863 births
1946 deaths
Sportspeople from Brighton
British male pair skaters
British male single skaters
English male pair skaters
English male single skaters
Figure skaters at the 1908 Summer Olympics
Medalists at the 1908 Summer Olympics
Olympic figure skaters of Great Britain
Olympic bronze medallists for Great Britain
Olympic medalists in figure skating
World Figure Skating Championships medalists